Robin Hood and the Valiant Knight is Child ballad 153.

Synopsis

The king and nobles meet to consider Robin Hood.  They send Sir William with a hundred men.  Sir William presents him with a letter from the king ordering Robin to surrender.  When Robin refuses, Sir William attempts to seize him on the spot.  Both Sir William and Robin summon their men, and they fight.  After the battle, Robin takes ill.  A monk lets his blood (a common medical procedure at the time), and Robin dies.  His men all flee.

Commentary
Bleeding was also the means of his death in the earlier Robin Hood's Death, but that, the more common version, had it done by an abbess, his cousin. This version also omits his usual reconciliation with the king.

Adaptations
Howard Pyle used this ballad's story for much of the conclusion of The Merry Adventures of Robin Hood, although he kept the older story of the abbess for the actual death.

External links
Robin Hood and the Valiant Knight

Child Ballads
Robin Hood ballads